The women's 3000 metres steeplechase event at the 2008 World Junior Championships in Athletics was held in Bydgoszcz, Poland, at Zawisza Stadium on 8 and 10 July.

Medalists

Results

Final
10 July

Heats
8 July

Heat 1

Heat 2

Participation
According to an unofficial count, 30 athletes from 23 countries participated in the event.

References

3000 metres steeplechasechase
Steeplechase at the World Athletics U20 Championships
2008 in women's athletics